Chuck "Kali Muscle" Kirkendall  (born February 18, 1975) is an American actor, author, bodybuilder and entertainer who has appeared in commercials for Taco Bell, GEICO, Snickers, Comcast, Honda and others.

Career
Kali Muscle has appeared as the bodybuilder in the Geico ad where he directs traffic. He also made an appearance in the music video for country singer Jamey Johnson.

He runs a fitness YouTube channel which as of April 2, 2021 has amassed over 2.7 million subscribers and over 400+ million views on his channel. His channel is mainly about bodybuilding and he talks about how to workout and train with limited equipment. He also has music videos, Mukbangs and short skits on his channel.

One of his early acting roles was in the 2011 film Wonder Woman.  The following year he appeared in the film Applebaum. Another film released that year was The Dog Who Saved the Holidays , a film about a crime busting Labrador called Zeus. The film starred Shelley Long, Gary Valentine and Dean Cain. He played the part of Mikey.  In 2014 he appeared in the episode Road to Natesville , from the TV series,  Raising Hope, playing the part of Brett.  He played the part of Bones in the Demetrius Navarro, Valente Rodriguez production, The Big Shot, a film about two small time film producers who have to make a successful movie as they are under pressure from their exec producer. They come up with an idea to kill one of their lead actors.

Kali Muscle has also been featured in music videos such as Kendrick Lamar - These walls

Health
In November 2021 Kirkendall suffered a heart attack and was admitted to hospital. He claimed he had a 100% blockage of his "main artery" (left main coronary artery). He underwent emergency surgery and was later discharged from the hospital.

Selected filmography

Film

Television

References

External links
 JOE.co.uk: This is what ex-con bodybuilder Kali Muscle looked like as a teenager By Ben Kenyon
 JOE.co.uk: Video: Bodybuilder Kali Muscle demonstrates his prison cell workout

1975 births
People from Oakland, California
African-American bodybuilders
21st-century American male actors
African-American male actors
American male film actors
American male television actors
Male actors from California
Living people
21st-century African-American sportspeople
20th-century African-American sportspeople